(KOF 2001, or KOF '01) is a fighting game produced by Eolith for the Neo Geo. It is the eighth game in The King of Fighters series, the third and final part of the "NESTS Chronicles" story arc, and the first game produced following the closure of the original SNK. The game was produced by the South Korea-based company Eolith and developed by Eolith and BrezzaSoft, a company formed by former SNK employees. The game was ported to the Sega Dreamcast in Japan only and PlayStation 2. The stand-alone PlayStation 2 version was released in North America and in Europe in a two-in-one bundle with the preceding game in the series, The King of Fighters 2000. Both the original Neo Geo version and the Sega Dreamcast version were included in The King of Fighters NESTS Hen compilation released for the PlayStation 2 in Japan.

Gameplay

Like in the previous game, the battles are once again between teams of four. Instead of a strict "three fighters and one striker" format, this installment introduces the Tactical Order System, which allows the player to select which characters will they control in combat and which characters will serve as strikers. Before each match, the player can form a team configuration of four fighters and no strikers, to one fighter and three strikers. The number of strikers in ones team will affect the length and number of stocks of the player's Power Gauge. Teams with no strikers will have a longer Power Gauge to fill and can carry only one stock, while a team with only one fighter and three strikers will fill their Power Gauge quicker and carry up to four stocks. One stock can be used to summon a striker, perform a guard or super cancel, a blow-away attack, or a Super Special Move. MAX-level Super Special Moves requires two stocks to perform. Players can now cancel an attack into a Striker Summon with use of a Cancel Striker, while some characters now have Wire Whip techniques which will send an opponent flying into the air and arrive at the other side of the fighting area.  

The King of Fighters 2001 is the last KOF game to feature the Striker System to date.

Plot
One year has passed since most of South Town was decimated by the now-destroyed Zero Cannon. Another KOF tournament is being held and this time, it's hosted by the NESTS cartel, the group of antagonists behind the events of the previous two games.

K′ and Maxima return to put an end to NESTS once and for all. They are now joined by former Ikari Warriors Team member Whip and the assassin Lin formerly from Benimaru's Team, both of whom are seeking the destruction of NESTS as well. NESTS sends their own team to compete in the tournament, composed of NESTS agents Kula Diamond, K9999, Foxy, and Ángel. Kyo Kusanagi joins his former teammates of Benimaru Nikaido and Goro Daimon, reuniting the original Japan Team along with Shingo Yabuki, while Iori Yagami joins a team composed of agents Seth, Vanessa, and Ramón. Yuri Sakazaki rejoins the Art of Fighting Team, while King and Mai Shiranui once again lead the Women Fighters Team along with the returning Li Xiangfei and Hinako Shijo. Heidern also makes his KOF return, taking Whip's place in the Ikari Warriors Team, while Kim Kaphwans young student May Lee takes over Jhun Hoon's place in the Korea Justice Team, the latter being unable to compete due to an injury.

Characters

The King of Fighters 2001 includes 10 teams of 4 fighters, a sub-boss, a final boss, and three strikers, totaling 45 combatants. New characters to the franchise are listed below in bold.

K’ Team (Hero Team)
 K′
 Maxima
 Whip
 Lin
Japan Team
 Kyo Kusanagi
 Benimaru Nikaido
 Goro Daimon
 Shingo Yabuki
Iori Team
 Iori Yagami
 Vanessa
 Seth
 Ramón
Ikari Warriors Team
 Leona
 Ralf Jones
 Clark Still
 Heidern

Fatal Fury Team
 Terry Bogard
 Andy Bogard
 Joe Higashi
 Blue Mary
Art of Fighting Team
 Ryo Sakazaki
 Robert Garcia
 Yuri Sakazaki
 Takuma Sakazaki
Women Fighters Team
 King
 Mai Shiranui
 Hinako Shijo
 Li Xiangfei
NESTS Team (Rivals Team)
 Kula Diamond
 Foxy
 K9999
 Ángel

Psycho Soldier Team
 Athena Asamiya
 Sie Kensou
 Chin Gentsai
 Bao
Korea Justice Team
 Kim Kaphwan
 Chang Koehan
 Choi Bounge
 May Lee Jinju
Sub-Boss
 Original Zero
 Krizalid (Striker)
 Ron (Striker)
 Glaugan (Striker)
Final Boss
 Igniz

Development
In 2000, SNK went bankrupt but Eolith contracted a license agreement in the same year to keep with the production of the series KOF. Eolith took interest into developing The King of Fighters due to the franchise's popularity in Korea and wanted to please the fans of the series worldwide. BrezzaSoft helped Eolith in the making of the video game. Fearing disappointment from returning fans, Eolith decided to maintain the most of the common parts from The King of Fighters while adding new elements to it. One of the biggest changes is the optional use of Strikers where players can use between one and three characters assisting the playable one. The team aimed for a refinement of the original gameplay system from previous KOF games. While performing a popularity poll based on the characters, Eolith still aimed to make the least popular teams featured in the game. The high popularity of Kyo Kusanagi and Iori Yagami led to their immediate inclusion in the game. The game was originally envisioned as a "Dream Match" game like The King of Fighters '98 and The King of Fighters 2002, but ultimately was the third canonical entry in the NESTS Chronicles storyline. Despite being created by Eolith, the Mexican company Evoga had a major influence in the game due to the franchise's popularity within Latin America. This to creating setting with Mexican traits and most notably Ángel, a NESTS agent from the country. References to works from Evoga can be seen in the scenarios from the game. While working on it, the team played The King of Fighters '98 alongside the developers to see if they could include a character within the game. A member from Evoga won, resulting in the team requesting to add Ángel in the game.

In creating new characters, Eolith wanted an Athena-like Korean fighter. This led to the inclusion of May Lee who was created by SNK. In preparing the boss characters, the original team was dissatisfied with Zero's portrayal in The King of Fighters 2000 which led to the inclusion of the real Zero retconning the former boss as a clone. Glaugan was originally going to be used in the prequel but was instead used as an assist character. SNK faced struggles with making Zero as they wanted to create a boss that surpassed Krizalid from The King of Fighters '99. The final boss, Igniz, was conceptualized as a sexually appealing character in order to generate a contrast with other members from the cast. Nevertheless, the development team stated they felt Igniz fit well in the game.

Reception
In Japan, Game Machine listed The King of Fighters 2001 on their December 15, 2001 issue as being the second most-successful arcade game of the month. According to Famitsu, the AES version sold over 6,126 copies in its first week on the market.

The PS2 port of the game sold 39,022 units in Japan. GameSpot gave the NeoGeo port of the game an 8.7 out of 10, praising the balance with the cast and the Striker system but criticized the high difficulty of the boss Igniz.

Notes

References

External links 
  
 The King of Fighters 2001 at GameFAQs
 The King of Fighters 2001 at Giant Bomb
 The King of Fighters 2001 at Killer List of Videogames
 The King of Fighters 2001 at MobyGames
 The King of Fighters 2000/2001 at MobyGames

2001 video games
2D fighting games
ACA Neo Geo games
Arcade video games
Dreamcast games
Fighting games
Multiplayer and single-player video games
Neo Geo games
Nintendo Switch games
PlayStation 2 games
PlayStation Network games
PlayStation 4 games
SNK games
SNK Playmore games
The King of Fighters games
Video games developed in South Korea
Video games scored by Kikuko Hataya
Video games scored by Masahiko Hataya
Video games set in Brazil
Video games set in China
Video games set in Italy
Video games set in Japan
Video games set in Korea
Video games set in Mexico
Video games set in the United States
Windows games
Xbox One games
Hamster Corporation games